Spangler is a surname.

Spangler may also refer to:

Places
Spangler, Pennsylvania, a former town and borough
Spangler, West Virginia, an unincorporated community
Spangler Hills, California, a low mountain range

Other uses
, a US Navy destroyer
Spangler Center, a Harvard Business School building on the campus of Harvard University
Spangler Arlington Brugh, birth name of Robert Taylor (actor) (1911–1969)
Bankhaus Spängler, the oldest private bank in Austria
Spangler Candy Company, located in Bryan, Ohio, United States

See also
Spangler Woods, a location used during the American Civil War Battle of Gettysburg